Under the Radar Volume 1 is a compilation album by English singer Robbie Williams, comprising demos, B-sides and rarities. It was released exclusively through Williams' website on 1 December 2014.

Release
Williams announced the album on 28 November 2014, when it was made available for pre-order exclusively through RobbieWilliams.com. The album was officially released in CD format three days later, on 1 December 2014, with a digital edition following on 8 December 2014.

The opening song "Bully" was released for free on 1 December to Williams' fans, presented by Café Royal, who promoted it on the same day in the brand's first television advert as part of the campaign "In the service of good taste".

Recording
"The Brits" was written and recorded over the course of two days in February 2013 and was released as a free demo through Williams' website. It was written as a nod to the awards ceremony.

Track listing

Volume 2
On 11 July 2017 Williams announced that the follow up to the album, Under the Radar Volume 2, would be released in November of that year and was available to pre-order from his official website.

References

2014 compilation albums
Robbie Williams albums